The San Martín Province is one of 10 provinces of the San Martín Region in northern Peru.

Political division
The province is divided into fourteen districts, which are:

 Alberto Leveau (Utcurarca)
 Cacatachi (Cacatachi)
 Chazuta (Chazuta)
 Chipurana (Navarro)
 El Porvenir (Pelejo)
 Huimbayoc (Huimbayoc)
 Juan Guerra (Juan Guerra)
 La Banda de Shilcayo (La Banda)
 Morales (Morales)
 Papaplaya (Papaplaya)
 San Antonio (San Antonio)
 Sauce (Sauce)
 Shapaja (Shapaja)
 Tarapoto (Tarapoto)

Places of interest 
 Sawsiqucha

See also 
 Administrative divisions of Peru

Provinces of the San Martín Region